Anette Viborg Andreasen (born 17 September 1990) is a Danish sailor. She and Allan Nørregaard placed 12th in the Nacra 17 event at the 2016 Summer Olympics.

References

1990 births
Living people
Danish female sailors (sport)
Olympic sailors of Denmark
Sailors at the 2016 Summer Olympics – Nacra 17